Carla Elago Ford (born November 21, 1974), better known as Karla Estrada, is a Filipino actress and singer. Films and television series in which she starred in Ina, Kasusuklaman Ba Kita? and Maricris Sioson: Japayuki. She starred as supporting role in the series Kailangan Ko'y Ikaw.

In 2016, Estrada signed a 2-year exclusive contract with ABS-CBN.

Early life and career
Carla Estrada was born as Carla Elago Ford on November 21, 1974, in Tacloban City to a Filipino mother and an American father. Shortly thereafter, her father left after being misinformed that Karla had died at birth.

According to an episode in Maalaala Mo Kaya featuring accounts on her life, Estrada was born to a rich family but was forced to move to Tacloban after the death of her grandfather, who was responsible for most of the livelihood of the family. Estrada aspired to become an actress since childhood and joined singing competitions. She was discovered by a talent manager in Quezon City, which led to her appearance in That's Entertainment.

Personal life
Estrada is the mother of Daniel Padilla whom she had at the age of 20; her son's father is, Rommel Padilla. Estrada brought Daniel to see Rommel Padilla in prison three years later. She had three children, Jose Carlito whom she had at the age of 21 with Naldy Padilla, Margaret and Carmella from different father.

At age 18, Estrada looked for her father who later apologized for not knowing that her birth was successful. In 2016, she stated that she is on good terms with her father, describing herself as his "carbon copy".

She is Antonio Aquitania's cousin.

Filmography

Television

Movies
Maid in Malacañang (2022)
Momshies! Ang Soul Mo’y Akin (2021)
Familia Blondina (2019)
Gandarrapiddo: The Revenger Squad (2017)
Beauty and the Bestie (2015)
Moron 5.2: The Transformation (2014)
Sa Ngalan ng Ama, Ina, at mga Anak (2014)
Palad Ta ang Nagbuot (Our Fate Decides) (2013) 
This Guy's in Love with U Mare! (2012) 
Pagnanasa  (2010) 
Pipo (2009)
Bahay Kubo: A Pinoy Mano Po! (2007)
Super Noypi (2006)
Kung Ikaw Ay Isang Panaginip (2002) 
Sa iyo ang sarap, akin ang hirap  (1999)
Banatan  (1999)
Masarap ang unang kagat  (1998)
Kakaibang karisma (1995)
The Secrets of Sarah Jane: Sana'y mapatawad mo (1994)
Bala at lipistik (1994)
Sobra talaga (1994) 
Teenage Mama (1993)
Kahit may mahal ka ng iba (1993)
Maricris Sioson: Japayuki (1993)
First Time... Like a Virgin! (1992)
Wanted Bata-Batuta (1987)

References

External links
 

1974 births
Living people
People from Tacloban
Waray people
Filipino film actresses
Filipino television actresses
Filipino child actresses
That's Entertainment (Philippine TV series)
Place of birth missing (living people)
That's Entertainment Wednesday Group Members
The Voice of the Philippines contestants
Filipino people of American descent
ABS-CBN personalities
GMA Network personalities
Filipino women comedians